Shabunin is a surname. Notable people with the surname include:

Ivan Shabunin (1935–2006), Russian politician
Vyacheslav Shabunin (born 1969), Russian middle-distance runner